Kühne Beveridge (born October 31, [1874 [?], Springfield, Illinois. - D. Unknown date between 1930 and 1951) was an American sculptor and the daughter of Phis Judson Beveridge and Ella Reutzger. She was the granddaughter of the 16th Governor of Illinois John L. Beveridge. She studied under William R. O'Donovan in New York City, and under Rodin in Paris. Among her works are a statue called "Rhodesia," "Rough Rider Monument," a statue called "Lascire," which belongs to Dr. Jameson, busts of Cecil Rhodes, King Edward VII, Grover Cleveland, Adlai Stevenson, Joseph Jefferson, Buffalo Bill, Bryan Mahon, Tom L. Johnson, and many others. Beveridge was first noticed as an artist in the US in 1892, when her busts of former President Cleveland and Mr. Jefferson called favorable attention to her. 

In 1893, she married actor Charles Francis Coghlan, and soon discovered that he had a living common-law wife at the time of her marriage. She obtained a divorce for desertion when Coghlan returned to live with the woman. Before she went to South Africa, Beveridge had executed several commissions for Cecil Rhodes and others living in that region. Beveridge received an Honorable Mention in the Paris Exposition in 1900. With the help of her mother, she also made a statue "The Veiled Venus" for the 1900 Paris Exposition which was awarded a bronze medal at the Paris Salon and was placed in Leeds Museum, England She also made "San Francisco weeping at the Golden Gate" for the San Francisco Golden Gate Park. Beveridge married a second time, August 25, 1903, to an American, Mr. William B. Branson, who resided at Johannesburg, in the Transvaal. 

In 1907 she resided in London. In 1910, under her maiden name, she exhibited in Leipzig, Germany, a sculpture of man and woman called "The Vampire" [the exploitation of woman by man].  In 1913, Beveridge was a resident of Mayfair, London England In 1914, her sister Ray Beveridge, an actress, was divorced from her husband Irving Seliger. In February 1916, Beveridge was interviewed in her Munich, Germany studio.  In May 1916, she was still at her Munich Studio. She was listed as a surviving child in her father's May 1921 obituary. In June 1930, she was selected as a member of the Illinois Hall of Fame. The 1951 obituary of her step-sister Mrs. Marian (Beveridge) Pringle does not list Kühne Beveridge as a survivor.

References

Bibliography

1874 births
People from Springfield, Illinois
American women sculptors
Year of death missing